When Everything Meant Everything is an EP by Matt Nathanson, released in November 2002. It was his last independent release before his Universal debut.

Track listing
"Pretty the World"  – 3:36 
"Fall to Pieces"  – 3:42 
"Princess"  – 3:09 
"Weight of It All"  – 3:15 
"Bent"  – 3:49

References
 Matt Nathanson official site

Matt Nathanson albums
2002 EPs